This is a list of Indian archers.

Indian female archers 

 Muskan Kirar
 Raj Kaur
 Dola Banerjee
 Ankita Bhakat
 Rimil Buriuly
 Krishna Das (archer)
 Trisha Deb
 Divya Dhayal
 Nisha Rani Dutta 
 Gagandeep Kaur
 Deepika Kumari
 Madhumita Kumari
 Reena Kumari
 Bombayla Devi Laishram
 Purnima Mahato
 Laxmirani Majhi
 Lily Chanu Paonam
 Jayalakshmi Sarikonda
 Sumangala Sharma
 Purvasha Shende
 Chekrovolu Swuro
 Pranitha Vardhineni
 Jyothi Surekha Vennam

Indian male archers 

 Rahul Banerjee
 Mangal Singh Champia
 Rajat Chauhan
 Atanu Das
 Gora Ho
 Sandeep Kumar (archer)
 Cherukuri Lenin
 Shyam Lal Meena
 Sanand Mitra
 Satyadev Prasad
 Tarundeep Rai
 Limba Ram
 Majhi Sawaiyan
 Sanjeeva Kumar Singh
 Jayanta Talukdar
 Abhishek Verma (archer)
 Atul Verma
 Vishwas (archer)

Indian archers